The New Zealand cricket team toured Bangladesh for two Test matches and three One Day International (ODI) matches in 2008–09. Bangladesh were under the captaincy of Mohammad Ashraful and the New Zealanders were led by Daniel Vettori. Starting on 9 October 2008, the New Zealanders won the ODI series 2-1 and the following Test series 1–0.

ODI series

1st ODI

2nd ODI

3rd ODI

Test series

1st test

2nd test

Tour match

Bangladesh Cricket Board XI vs New Zealand

External links
Cricinfo page on the tour

International cricket competitions in 2008–09
2008-09
Bangladeshi cricket seasons from 2000–01
2008 in Bangladeshi cricket
2008 in New Zealand cricket